Raijmondus "Raymond" Godefriedus Norbert van de Klundert (known commonly as Kluun or Ray Kluun, born 17 April 1964) is a Dutch author. He is well known for his novel Love Life (Dutch: Komt een vrouw bij de dokter), in which he documents a fictionalized version of his own life story; a husband committing adultery while his wife is dying of cancer.

Background
Kluun's wife Judith died from breast cancer at 36 years old (2000). He wanted to express his feelings for his late wife, so he used his experience to write his first novel Komt een vrouw bij de dokter (Love Life) 3 years later in 2003. He then wrote the sequel De weduwnaar (The widower) to talk about his move to Australia with their daughter after Judith died.

Works
 Komt een vrouw bij de dokter (Love Life) (2003)
 Help, ik heb mijn vrouw zwanger gemaakt! (2004)
 De weduwnaar (The widower) (2006)
 Memoires van een marketingsoldaat (2008)
 Klunen (2008)
 Van Leven ga je dood (2008)
 God is gek (2009)
 Haantjes (2011)
 DJ (2017)
 Familieopstelling (2020)
 Help, ik heb een puber! (2022)

References

External links
 
 Komt een vrouw bij de dokter at kluun.hl
 The official website of the movie "Komt een vrouw bij de dokter" (Love Life)

1964 births
Living people
Dutch writers
People from Tilburg